Grigory Ivanovich Fedotov (29 March 1916 – 8 December 1957) was a Soviet professional football player and manager.

Personal life
His son was fellow player Vladimir Fedotov.

External links
Profile at Footballfacts.ru

1916 births
1957 deaths
People from Noginsk
Soviet footballers
Russian footballers
PFC CSKA Moscow players
Soviet Top League players
Association footballers not categorized by position
Sportspeople from Moscow Oblast